This is a list of significant dust storms.

Notes

References

See also
 Dust Bowl, a period of severe dust storms in the 1930s affecting the United States and Canada

Dust storms
Weather-related lists